The Pears Family Charitable Foundation is a charitable trust established in 1991 by three brothers, Trevor Pears, David Pears and Mark Pears. Much of the foundation's income is generated by the William Pears Group, a property company established by the Pears brothers’ father.

The foundation supports a wide variety of causes, including several causes relating to Israel, Judaism and antisemitism, such as:
 Jhub
 Parliamentary Committee Against Antisemitism Foundation
 Pears Institute for the Study of Antisemitism

References 

Charities based in the United Kingdom